The Glass Palace Chronicle of the Kings of Burma is the only English language translation of the first portions of Hmannan Yazawin, the standard chronicle of the Konbaung dynasty of Burma (Myanmar). Hmannan was translated into English by Pe Maung Tin and Gordon H. Luce in 1923, who gave it its English name.

George Coedes cites the chronicle for a "very romanticized account of the events following the death of Alaungsithu."

See also
 The Glass Palace

References

External links
The full text of The Glass Palace Chronicle at the Internet Archive

1923 non-fiction books
Konbaung dynasty
Burmese chronicles